Tour du Lot: The Department of the Lot sits at the northern end of the Midi-Pyrénées region of France. The Tour du Lot is a circuit of over 500 km around the Department's periphery using a mixture of GR routes, footpaths, bridleways, and quiet country roads, which can be completed on foot, by off-road bike or on horseback. The official route was devised by the Comité Départmental de la Randonée Pédestre (CODERANDO 46), the Association Départmentale de Tourisme Equestre (ATE), and the Comité Départmental de Cyclotourisme VTT (CODEP 46 FFCT), supported financially and technically by the Counseil Général du Lot, the Départmentale de la Jeunesse et des Sports, and the Comité Départmental du Tourisme.

For walkers embarking on the Tour du Lot the circuit is broken down into 14 stages, starting and ending at Laval de Cère in the north east of the Department. With two exceptions, each stage is walked over two days, covering on average 19 km a day, with the possibility of an overnight stop at a chambre d'hote, hotel or campsite, depending on the walker's preference or availability of accommodation. The other two stages are one-day walks. The route is poorly signed but the official Tour du Lot symbol is shown below.

The 14 stages are as follows:

External links and References 
 Tour du Lot Equestre, Pedestre & VTT, (1992), FranceQuercy Cahors
 Photographs and gps traces for the Tour du Lot
 CazalRando walking club in French and English
 Department du Lot Office web site
 Rocamadour Tourist Office web site

Geography of Lot (department)
Tourist attractions in Lot (department)